Maxime "Superstar" Talbot (born February 11, 1984) is a Canadian former professional ice hockey centre who played in the National Hockey League (NHL) for the Pittsburgh Penguins, Philadelphia Flyers, Colorado Avalanche and Boston Bruins. He was drafted into the NHL out of the Quebec Major Junior Hockey League (QMJHL) by the Pittsburgh Penguins, 234th overall, in the 2002 NHL Entry Draft. He led the Hull/Gatineau Olympiques to back-to-back President's Cups while earning the Guy Lafleur Trophy as playoff MVP both years.

During the 2009 Stanley Cup Finals against the Detroit Red Wings, while still playing for Pittsburgh, Talbot scored his team's only two goals in Pittsburgh's 2–1 victory over Detroit in the series-deciding Game 7, securing the Penguins' Stanley Cup championship win.

Talbot finished his career playing three seasons in the Kontinental Hockey League (KHL) for Lokomotiv Yaroslavl and Avangard Omsk.

Playing career

Amateur
Talbot was selected by the Quebec Major Junior Hockey League (QMJHL)'s Rouyn-Noranda Huskies in the first round of the 2000 QMJHL Draft. At the league trade deadline that year, Talbot was traded to the Hull Olympiques in exchange for Alexandre Giroux. Talbot completed his major junior rookie season with a combined 37 points between the two teams.

Before the start of the 2002–03 season, Talbot was named team captain for the Olympiques and finished the year with a major junior career-high 46 goals and 104 points in 69 games, good for fifth in QMJHL scoring and for QMJHL Second All-Star Team honours. In the playoffs that year, he led the league in scoring with 44 points in 20 games as he captained the Olympiques to a QMJHL Championship, also earning the Guy Lafleur Trophy as playoff MVP in the process. Playing the Ontario Hockey League (OHL)'s Kitchener Rangers in the final of the subsequent 2003 Memorial Cup, they were defeated 6–3.

In the 2003–04 season, Talbot finished third in scoring in the QMJHL with 98 points (25 goals and 73 assists) in 51 games as the team became the Gatineau Olympiques through the amalgamation of Hull into the City of Gatineau. He led the team to a second consecutive QMJHL championship while again being named playoff MVP and leading the league in playoff scoring for the second-straight year. He was the first to earn back-to-back Guy Lafleur Trophies since Marc Saumier in 1987 and 1988. However, the Olympiques were defeated for the second-straight year in the Memorial Cup Final, losing 2–1 to the Western Hockey League (WHL)'s Kelowna Rockets.

Pittsburgh Penguins

As the 2004–05 season approached, Talbot was signed by the Pittsburgh Penguins and was assigned to make his professional debut with the team's American Hockey League (AHL) affiliate, the Wilkes-Barre/Scranton Penguins. He was assigned to various linemates and was placed in many role playing opportunities. He did not have the offensive power in the AHL, however, that he did in the QMJHL, but nonetheless Talbot showed quality traits in other aspects of the game as he finished his debut season with 19 points (7 goals and 12 assists) in 75 games.

With an impressive training camp, Talbot made the Penguins' opening roster for the 2005–06 season, making his NHL debut against the New Jersey Devils. He scored his first career NHL goal on October 14, 2005, from centre ice against the Philadelphia Flyers. His primary role during his rookie season was that of a penalty killer. He would later be sent down to the AHL after 48 games in the NHL, during which time he recorded eight points (five goals and three assists).

Talbot did not start the 2006–07 season in the NHL but was recalled by Pittsburgh on October 24, 2006, just five games into the AHL season. He would play that same night against New Jersey. Talbot continued to play a key role on the penalty kill, recording four short-handed goals to go with a season total of 24 points (13 goals and 11 assists).

Talbot scored four goals in the first five games of the 2007–08 season. He was the part of an on-ice prank on December 1, 2007, when he briefly donned the jersey of teammate Sidney Crosby during an optional practice that Crosby had chosen to skip. He initially drew a large cheer from the crowd in Toronto before they realized the jersey switch.

In Game 3 of the 2008 Eastern Conference Quarterfinals, Talbot scored a backhand goal against Ottawa Senators goaltender Martin Gerber less than five minutes after the Senators had taken the lead in that game. In the Conference Finals against the Philadelphia Flyers, Talbot scored the game-winning goal in the third period of Game 2. He did this in his first game back from a broken foot that had sidelined him for the previous four playoff games. In Game 5 of the 2008 Stanley Cup Finals against the Detroit Red Wings, he scored the tying goal with 35 seconds remaining, allowing the Penguins to score in triple overtime to force a Game 6. 
  

Midway through the final year of his initial contract with the Penguins, 2008–09, on December 19, 2008, Talbot signed a new two-year contract with Pittsburgh through to the end of the 2010–11 season. The Penguins returned to the Stanley Cup Finals for the second consecutive year against Detroit. Talbot scored both of the Penguins' goals in the seventh and deciding game of the series to capture Pittsburgh's third Stanley Cup.

For the 2009–10 season, Talbot served as the Penguins' representative to the National Hockey League Players' Association (NHLPA), a position he took over from Matt Cooke.

While playing for the Penguins, Talbot has appeared in numerous television commercials, including Valley Pool and Spa, City of Champions Crunch cereal (which featured Talbot on one side of the box and Pittsburgh Steeler Hines Ward on the other) and three commercials for Pittsburgh A&L Motor Sales (these A&L commercials have earned him the nickname "Superstar"). He also appeared in a Reebok commercial with teammate Sidney Crosby, which aired during the 2010 NHL Winter Classic.

While promoting the 2011 NHL Winter Classic, Talbot called-out Washington Capitals captain Alexander Ovechkin during an interview with a Pittsburgh radio station, calling him "a real douche".

Philadelphia Flyers and Colorado Avalanche

After being unable to come to terms with the Penguins on a new contract, Talbot signed a five-year, $8.75 million contract with the Penguins' in-state rival Philadelphia Flyers on July 1, 2011. On December 29, 2011, during a 4–2 Philadelphia victory, Talbot scored an empty net goal in his first game back in Pittsburgh against the Penguins since signing with the Flyers. He would finish his first season in Philadelphia appearing in 81 regular season games, scoring 19 goals and 15 assists for a total of 34 points; all three statistics were NHL career-highs for Talbot. Talbot and the Flyers would ultimately face the Penguins in the Eastern Conference Quarterfinals of the 2012 playoffs, a series that saw the Flyers defeat the Penguins in six games. Talbot scored four goals during the series, two of which were short-handed.

After the first month of the 2013–14 season with the Flyers, on October 31, 2013, Talbot was traded to the Colorado Avalanche in exchange for Steve Downie. On December 6, 2013, Talbot scored his first Avalanche goal in a 3–2 win over the Calgary Flames.

Boston Bruins
With the Avalanche on the outside of the 2015 playoff picture, Talbot was traded at the NHL trade deadline on March 2, 2015, (along with Paul Carey) to the Boston Bruins in exchange for Jordan Caron and a sixth-round pick in the 2016 NHL Entry Draft.

On December 21, 2015, the NHL announced that it was suspending Talbot for two games because of a hit on New Jersey Devils forward Jiří Tlustý in a game played the day prior.

Kontinental Hockey League
At the conclusion of his contract with the Bruins, and as an impending free agent, Talbot opted to continue his playing career abroad in the Kontinental Hockey League (KHL), agreeing to a one-year deal with Russian club Lokomotiv Yaroslavl on May 27, 2016. Talbot played two seasons with Lokomotiv before leaving as a free agent and signing a one-year contract on August 25, 2018, to remain in the KHL with Avangard Omsk for the 2018–19 season.

International play

Talbot helped Canada win a silver medal as an alternate captain during the 2004 World Junior Championships held in Helsinki.

In 2016, Talbot was a member of Team Canada at the 2016 Deutschland Cup.

Personal life
Talbot's father, Serge, is a construction worker; his mother Lucie is a high school teacher. Talbot has two older brothers, Will and Frank.

Talbot married Canadian former figure skating champion Cynthia Phaneuf on July 11, 2014. The couple have three children.

Career statistics

Regular season and playoffs

International

Awards and honours

References

External links

 
Max Talbot Foundation

1984 births
Avangard Omsk players
Boston Bruins players
Canadian ice hockey centres
Colorado Avalanche players
French Quebecers
Gatineau Olympiques players
Hull Olympiques players
Ice hockey people from Quebec
Ilves players
Living people
Lokomotiv Yaroslavl players
Philadelphia Flyers players
Pittsburgh Penguins draft picks
Pittsburgh Penguins players
Providence Bruins players
Rouyn-Noranda Huskies players
Sportspeople from Longueuil
Stanley Cup champions
Wilkes-Barre/Scranton Penguins players